Paramount Players is an American film production label of Paramount Pictures, focusing on "contemporary properties" while working with other Paramount Global brands. The name alludes to the company's earliest origins as Famous Players Film Company, before its 1914 founding by William Wadsworth Hodkinson.

History
On June 7, 2017, Jim Gianopulos, who joined Paramount Pictures as the Chairman and CEO in March, announced the launch of the Paramount Players division with Brian Robbins, the founder and former CEO of AwesomenessTV, as president. Robbins will work with Viacom’s Nickelodeon, MTV, Comedy Central and BET operations to generate projects while the new division focuses on "contemporary properties." The division was created after Paramount and Viacom expressed disappointment at Comedy Central stars Jordan Peele and Amy Schumer producing their own films (2017's Get Out and 2015's Trainwreck, respectively) for Universal Pictures due to feeling "unwelcome" by Paramount's former executives.

On August 17, 2017, Paramount Players acquired its first project, which is a film adaptation of the book Vacation Guide to the Solar System by Jonathan Goldstein and John Francis Daley.

On October 1, 2018, Brian Robbins left his position as the president of Paramount Players after Viacom tapped him to be the president of Nickelodeon, ending his 16-month run at the studio. Despite leaving the studio, he will remain involved with Paramount Players' Nickelodeon films (Dora and the Lost City of Gold and Playing with Fire). Wyck Godfrey, the president of Paramount Motion Picture Group, is serving as interim and will oversee day-to-day operations with support from Robbins until Paramount finds a new president for the studio.

On June 30, 2020, Emma Watts replaced Wyck Godfrey as the president of Paramount Motion Picture Group and began on July 20 (Godfrey returned to producing). In October, Watts tapped Jeremy Kramer as president.

On March 8, 2022, Kramer stepped down and the studio's operations were merged into the purview of Mike Ireland and Daria Cercek, the head executives of the Paramount Pictures Motion Picture Group, though Paramount Players and its current film inventory remains otherwise unaffected.

Films

Released films

Upcoming films

In development

Highest-grossing films

References

Paramount Pictures
Entertainment companies based in California
Film production companies of the United States
Companies based in Los Angeles
Entertainment companies established in 2017
2017 establishments in California